William Sweet is a Canadian philosopher.

William Sweet may also refer to:
 William Ellery Sweet (1869–1942), Governor of Colorado
 William L. Sweet (1850–1931), New York politician
 William Russell Sweet (1860–1946), Rhode Island painter and sculptor